2021–22 Belarusian Cup was the thirty first season of the Belarusian annual cup competition. Contrary to the league season, it is conducted in a fall-spring rhythm. It started in May 2021 and ended with a final match on 21 May 2022. The winner of the cup, Gomel, qualified for the second qualifying round of the 2022–23 UEFA Europa Conference League.

Preliminary round
70 clubs from the Belarusian Second League and lower regional leagues entered in this round. The draw was performed on 28 April 2021. The matches were played on 8 and 9 May 2021.

First round
35 winners of Preliminary Round were joined by another 5 clubs from the Belarusian Second League. The draw was performed on 28 April 2021. The matches were played on 22 and 23 May 2021.

Second round
20 winners of previous round were joined by 10 clubs from the Belarusian First League. The draw was performed on 24 May 2021. The matches were played between 29 May and 16 June 2021.

Third round
15 winners of previous round were joined by 1 club from Belarusian First League and 16 clubs from Belarusian Premier League. The draw was performed on 1 June 2021. The matches were played between 22 June and 19 July 2021.

Round of 16
The draw was performed on 13 July 2021. The matches were played between 7 and 9 August 2021.

Quarter-finals

|}

First leg

Second leg

Semi-finals

|}

First leg

Second leg

Final
The final was played on 21 May 2022 at Dinamo Stadium in Minsk.

References

External links
 Football.by

2021–22 European domestic association football cups
Cup
Cup
2021–22